The 2011 Bolivian special municipal elections were held on 18 December 2011. These elections cover three of five municipalities currently without elected mayors  in Bolivia: Sucre, Quillacollo, and Pazña. Elections for the Mayor of Punata will be held 29 April or 6 May 2012. Newly elected mayors will receive their credentials from the Supreme Electoral Tribunal on 27 January 2011, after which they may be sworn in.

Elections

Mayoral races

Sucre
In Sucre, the mayoral candidates are as follows:
 Horacio Poppe - May 25 Movement (Falangist)
 Moisés Torres Ramírez -  Renewing Freedom and Democracy (LÍDER) Front
 Orlando Hurtado - Without Fear Movement
 (withdrawn, but on the ballot) Jaime Hurtado Poveda - Pact of Social Integration (PAÍS)–National Unity Front Alliance
 Maribel Salinas - We Are All Chuquisaca
 Iván Arciénega – Movement for Socialism – Political Instrument for the Sovereignty of the Peoples (MAS-IPSP)
Despite ideological affinity, the right-wing parties were unable to decide on an alliance candidate until the week of the poll. However, the National Unity Front and Pact of Social Integration unified on December 13 behind the candidacy of Moisés Torres Ramírez, bringing the number of right-leaning candidates down by one.

Results
The right-wing opposition candidate Moisés Torres Ramírez was elected; he won a plurality, and a majority if the votes for his coalition partner Jaime Hurtado Poveda are included. 

|- style="background:#E9E9E9;"
! colspan="2" | Mayoral Candidate
! Party
! Votes
! Percentage
|-
| style="background-color:orange" | 
| style="text-align:left;" | Moisés Torrez Chive
| style="text-align:left;" | Renewing Freedom and Democracy (LIDER)
| 50,453
| 46.35%
|-
| style="background-color:blue" | 
| style="text-align:left;" | Iván Jorge Arciénega Collazos
| style="text-align:left;" | Movement towards Socialism
| 41,387
| 38.02%
|-
| style="background-color:black" | 
| style="text-align:left;" | Horacio Poppe Inch
| style="text-align:left;" | May 25 Movement
| 7,003
| 6.43%
|-
| style="background-color:red" | 
| style="text-align:left;" | withdrawn: Jaime Eduardo Hurtado Poveda
| style="text-align:left;" | Unity-Pact of Social Integration
| 5,679
| 5.22%
|-
| style="background-color:#7FFF00;" | 
| style="text-align:left;" | Orlando Hurtado Choque
| style="text-align:left;" | Without Fear Movement
| 2,563
| 2.35%
|-
| style="background-color:yellow" | 
| style="text-align:left;" | Maribel Salinas Ortega
| style="text-align:left;" | We Are All Chuquisaca
| 1,769
| 1.63%
|-
| style="background-color:white" | 
| 
| style="text-align:left;" | Valid votes
| 108,854
| 90.55%
|-
| style="background-color:white" | 
| 
| style="text-align:left;" | Blank votes
| style="text-align:right;" | 1,454
| style="text-align:right;" | 1.21%
|-
| style="background-color:white" | 
| 
| style="text-align:left;" | Null votes
| style="text-align:right;" | 9,905
| style="text-align:right;" | 8.24%
|-
| 
| 
| style="text-align:left;" | Total votes	
| style="text-align:right;" | 120,213
| style="text-align:right;" | 74.05% of registered voters
|-
| colspan="10" style="text-align:left;" | Source: Tribunal Supremo Electoral, ELECCIÓN DE ALCALDESA O ALCALDE - 2011 RESULTADOS PARCIALES - MUNICIPIO - SUCRE

Quillacollo
In Quillacollo, the mayoral candidates are as follows:
 René Fernández Céspedes - Without Fear Movement (MSM)
 Miguel Edwin Guzmán Achá - Movement for Socialism – Political Instrument for the Sovereignty of the Peoples (MAS-IPSP)
 Charles Cristhian Becerra - Unity New Hope (UNE)
Some 82 thousand people are registered to vote in the municipality.

Results

|- style="background:#E9E9E9;"
! colspan="2" | Mayoral Candidate
! Party
! Votes
! Percentage
|-
| style="background-color:orange" | 
| style="text-align:left;" | Charles Christhian Becerra Sejas
| style="text-align:left;" | Unity New Hope
| 20,043
| 37.97%
|-
| style="background-color:blue" | 
| style="text-align:left;" | Miguel Edwin Guzmán Achá
| style="text-align:left;" | Movement towards Socialism
| 19,477
| 36.90%
|-
| style="background-color:#7FFF00;" | 
| style="text-align:left;" | René Fernández Cespédes
| style="text-align:left;" | Without Fear Movement
| 13,261
| 25.12%
|-
| style="background-color:white" | 
| 
| style="text-align:left;" | Valid votes
| 52,781
| 90.24%
|-
| style="background-color:white" | 
| 
| style="text-align:left;" | Blank votes
| style="text-align:right;" | 748
| style="text-align:right;" | 1.28%
|-
| style="background-color:white" | 
| 
| style="text-align:left;" | Null votes
| style="text-align:right;" | 4,960
| style="text-align:right;" | 8.48%
|-
| 
| 
| style="text-align:left;" | Total votes	
| style="text-align:right;" | 58,489
| style="text-align:right;" | 70.95% of registered voters
|-
| colspan="10" style="text-align:left;" | Source: Tribunal Supremo Electoral, ELECCIÓN DE ALCALDESA O ALCALDE - 2011 RESULTADOS PARCIALES - MUNICIPIO - QUILLACOLLO

Pazña
In Pazña, the mayoral candidates are as follows:
 Pablo Alejandro Valero - Without Fear Movement (MSM)
 Gróver Peñafiel - Movement for Socialism – Political Instrument for the Sovereignty of the Peoples (MAS-IPSP)

References

Local elections in Bolivia
2011 elections in South America
General
December 2011 events in South America